The Spectrum Award for Grand Master has been awarded annually since 1995 by the Spectrum Fantastic Art Advisory Board.

A Grand Master, as Arnie Fenner (SFA Advisory Board member) has explained, is an artist who has worked for at least twenty years at a consistently high level of quality; who has influenced and inspired other artists; and who has left his or her mark on the field as a whole. "Craft alone" he writes, " is not sufficient to receive the honor: There are many painters who produce solid professional work. But (and this is the key) it fails to resonate. It is admired in the moment and immediately forgotten. A Grand Master's art, on the other hand, gets stuck in the viewer's heart and memory.

Arnie Fenner also states "At the time of the designation is given the artist must be living. Recently, two GM honorees died prior to the announcement --Al Williamson and Ralph McQuarrie-- which confused a few people, but...both were still with us when the Board bestowed the honor."

Winners

External links 
 Official Spectrum Fantastic Art website
 Spectrum Fantastic Art Live

References 

Spectrum Award
Visual arts awards
Science fiction awards
Fantasy awards
Lists of speculative fiction-related award winners and nominees